Antonio Salvatore Dattilo Rubbo (Napoli 21 June 1870 – Sydney 1 June 1955) was an Italian-born artist and art teacher active in Australia from 1897.

Rubbo, or Dattilo-Rubbo, was born in Naples in 1870, and spent his early childhood in the Neapolitan municipality of Frattamaggiore. He studied painting under Domenico Morelli and Filippo Palizzi before emigrating to Australia,
arriving in Sydney in 1897. From 1898 Rubbo taught in Sydney schools including St. Joseph's College, Hunters Hill, Kambala School,  The Scots College and Newington College. Dattilo Rubbo was not a great artist - "muddy genre portraits of very wrinkled old Tuscan peasants were his strong suit," according to critic Robert Hughes - but he was an inspiring art teacher, responsible for introducing a whole generation of Australian painters to modernism through his art school (opened in 1898) and his classes at the Royal Art Society of New South Wales.

In contrast to nearly all other art teachers in Australia at the time, he was not a reactionary, and encouraged his students to experiment with styles as radically different from his own as post-impressionism and cubism. He was a flamboyant character who believed in championing his students to the hilt; indeed, in 1916 he challenged a committee member of the Royal Art Society to a duel because he had refused to hang a post-impressionist landscape by his pupil Roland Wakelin. Other students included Norah Simpson, Frank Hinder, Grace Cossington Smith (whom Dattilo Rubbo referred to affectionately as 'Mrs Van Gogh'), Donald Friend ("Aha Donaldo, always the barocco; rub it out, boy, rub it out!"), Roy De Maistre, war artist Roy Hodgkinson, Archibald Prize winner Arthur Murch, social realist Roy Dalgarno, Tom Bass, and more. In 1924 he helped to found Manly Art Gallery and Historical Collection which holds over one hundred and thirty of his works.

When he retired, one of his teaching staff, Giuseppe Fontanelli Bissietta, known as a member of the Six Directions group, took over his "ADR" school in "Century House", 70 Pitt Street, Sydney.

See also
 Art of Australia

References

1870 births
1955 deaths
Australian art teachers
20th-century Italian painters
Italian male painters
Staff of Newington College
20th-century Australian painters
20th-century Italian male artists
Australian male painters